Michael Sean Ryan (born July 6, 1977 in Indiana, Pennsylvania) is an American former professional baseball outfielder.

Career
He was drafted by the Minnesota Twins organization in 5th round of the 1996 Major League Baseball Draft.

Ryan's spring training of 2007 was great, with the Pirates organization, batting .396 with an on-base percentage of .418 and a slugging percentage of .547. Ryan scored 17 runs with 9 RBI on 21 hits. Ryan signed with the Somerset Patriots of the Atlantic League on March 24, . The Florida Marlins purchased his contract on July 23, 2008, after batting .282 with 15 home runs and being elected to the Atlantic League All-star game.

On September 14, Ryan was involved with a bizarre outfield play during a game against the Cleveland Indians, where Jhonny Peralta hit a fly ball to Ryan in right-center field. Ryan shaded his eyes before lowering his glove, and was hit in the side of the face by the pop-fly. The out was saved, however, because outfielder Dustan Mohr caught the ball on the rebound. He left the game with a welt above his left eye.

On January 13, Ryan signed a minor league contract with an invitation to spring training with the Florida Marlins.

Ryan signed a minor league contract with the Los Angeles Angels of Anaheim on February 4, 2010. The contract included an invitation to spring training. He was called up from the minors on May 7, 2010.

In November 2011, he signed a minor league contract with the Pittsburgh Pirates to be a player/coach. In January 2013, he was named the manager for the 2013 West Virginia Power. In January 2015, Ryan was named as the manager for the Pirates' High-A affiliate the Bradenton Marauders. In December 2016, Ryan was named as the manager for the Pirates' AA affiliate the Altoona Curve.

References

External links

1977 births
Living people
Albuquerque Isotopes players
Altoona Curve managers
American expatriate baseball players in Canada
Baseball coaches from Pennsylvania
Baseball players from Pennsylvania
Bradenton Marauders managers
Edmonton Trappers players
Elizabethton Twins players
Fort Myers Miracle players
Fort Wayne Wizards players
Gulf Coast Twins players
Indianapolis Indians players
Los Angeles Angels players
Major League Baseball outfielders
Major League Baseball designated hitters
Minnesota Twins players
Navegantes del Magallanes players
American expatriate baseball players in Venezuela
New Britain Rock Cats players
New Orleans Zephyrs players
People from Indiana, Pennsylvania
Richmond Braves players
Rochester Red Wings players
Salt Lake Bees players
Salt Lake Buzz players
Somerset Patriots players
West Virginia Power managers